Sangan (also Romanized as Sangān and Sankān; also known as Sangān-e Pā’īn) is a village in Sulqan Rural District, Kan District, Tehran County, Tehran Province, Iran. In 2006, its population was 749, in 195 families.  Sangan Waterfall is located nearby.

References 

Populated places in Tehran County